Alphapets is a series of children's books by Ruth Lerner Perle, Deborah Colvin Borgo, Judy Blankenship and Richard Max Kolding. They are similar to the Sweet Pickles books in that each letter of the alphabet is represented in a separate book with an animal representing each letter. Each story was filled with words and objects that begin with the letter of the alphabet featured in that book. A special word page at the end of each book provided extra practice in identifying letters and words. The series was initially published in the early 1990s.

Each story followed a similar formula in that typically each animal has a distinct personality trait. This trait was used to build the plot and to impart a moral lesson to the reader. For example, in Justin's Just Joking, Justin is always playing jokes on his friends, making them feel sad. At the end of the book, Justin's friends play a joke on him to make him understand how much his jokes hurt.

These books are appropriate for beginning readers of all ages; however, depending on the child's reading skill, the series are generally recommended for children from Preschool through to 3rd grade.

Characters
Aa - Albert the Absent-minded Alligator
Bb - Bradley the Brave Bear
Cc - Connie the Cuddly Cat
Dd - Delilah the Demanding Duck
Ee - Emmy the Exaggerating Elephant
Ff - Fenton the Fearful Frog
Gg - Gertie the Grungy Goat
Hh - Herbie the Happy Hamster
Ii - Ivy the Impatient Iguana
Jj - Justin the Joking Jackal
Kk - Katy the Kind Koala
Ll - Lizzy the Lazy Lamb
Mm - Monty the Mimicking Mouse
Nn - Nelly the Naughty Newt
Oo - Ollie the Obedient Ostrich
Pp - Perry the Polite Porcupine
Qq - Queenie the Quiet Quail
Rr - Rupert the Resourceful Rhinoceros
Ss - Sylvester the Stubborn Squirrel
Tt - Tina the Truthful Tiger
Uu - Una the Unhappy Unicorn
Vv - Vinnie the Vocal Vulture
Ww - Wendy the Wise Woodchuck
Xx - Xavier the X-ploring Xenops
Yy - Yori the Yucky Yak
Zz - Ziggy the Zippy Zebra

Books
A - Albert's Special Day
B - Bradley and The Great Swamp Mystery
C - Connie, Come Home
D - Delilah's Delightful Dream
E - Emmy, You're The Greatest
F - Fenton and the Magic Bag
G - Gertie's Great Gifts
H - Herbie's Happy Day
I - Ivy Can't Wait
J - Justin's Just Joking
K - Katy's Surprise
L - Lizzy at Last
M - Monty See Monty Do
N - Nelly, That's Not Nice
O - Ollie's Folly
P - Perry's Not So Perfect Day
Q - Queenie's Secret
R - Rupert to the Rescue
S - Sylvester and the Sand Castle
T - Tina Tells the Truth
U - Una Cheers Us Up
V - Vinnie Takes a Bow
W - Wendy's Clubhouse
X - Xavier and the Laughing Xoxos
Y - Yori and Yetta
Z - Ziggy and the Zig-Zag Race

There are also 4 additional books, which complement the publications, and feature most of the cast of the AlphaPets series:
Take One Home Free - subtracting
Money Doesn't Grow on Trees - a story about saving and making money
And One More Makes Ten - counting and addition
Way to Go, Albert! - telling time

Alphabet books
American picture books
Series of children's books
1990s children's books